Nikita Baranov (born 19 August 1992) is an Estonian professional footballer who plays as a centre back for Armenian Premier League club Pyunik and the Estonia national team.

Club career

Early career
Baranov began playing football with Puuma's youth teams. He then played for Ararat, Elva and Warrior.

Flora
In 2010, Baranov signed for Flora. He made his Flora – and Meistriliiga – debut on 14 August 2010, in a 5–0 home victory over Lootus. He won his first Meistriliiga title in the 2011 season, and his second one in the 2015 season.

Kristiansund
On 15 February 2017, Baranov signed a two-year contract with Eliteserien club Kristiansund.

Sogndal
On 26 July 2018, Baranov signed a one-and-a-half year contract with OBOS-ligaen club Sogndal.

Beroe
Baranov joined Beroe in January 2019, but was released in early August 2019.

Alashkert
Baranov joined Armenian club FC Alashkert in August 2019 with a one-year deal. On 27 July 2020, his contract was ended by mutual consent.

Karmiotissa
On 20 August 2020 he signed Cypriot top-division club Karmiotissa and debuted a day later.

Hamrun Spartans
In May 2021 he signed for Maltese champions Hamrun Spartans.

International career
Baranov made his senior international debut for Estonia on 11 November 2015, in a 3–0 home victory over Georgia in a friendly.

Honours

Club
Pyunik
 Armenian Premier League: 2021–22

Flora
Meistriliiga: 2011, 2015
Estonian Cup: 2012–13, 2015–16
Estonian Supercup: 2011, 2012, 2016

References

External links

1992 births
Living people
Estonian footballers
Estonian people of Russian descent
Association football defenders
FC Puuma Tallinn players
FC Elva players
FC Warrior Valga players
FC Flora players
Kristiansund BK players
Sogndal Fotball players
PFC Beroe Stara Zagora players
Esiliiga players
Meistriliiga players
Eliteserien players
Norwegian First Division players
First Professional Football League (Bulgaria) players
Estonia youth international footballers
Estonia under-21 international footballers
Estonia international footballers
Estonian expatriate footballers
Estonian expatriate sportspeople in Norway
Expatriate footballers in Norway
Expatriate footballers in Bulgaria
Estonian expatriate sportspeople in Bulgaria
Footballers from Tallinn
Estonian expatriate sportspeople in Cyprus
Expatriate footballers in Cyprus
Estonian expatriate sportspeople in Armenia
Expatriate footballers in Armenia